Albuera was launched at Moulmain (British Burma), in 1854. She made three voyages to Adelaide between 1854 and 1874. In 1858 she transported eleven convicts from Calcutta, India to Fremantle, Western Australia, arriving on 28 October 1858. The eleven convicts were all soldiers and  sailors who had been convicted by court-martial in India, and sentenced to transportation. There were no other passengers on board. She was last listed in 1881.

List of convicts on the Albuera

Citations

References

See also
List of convict ship voyages to Western Australia
Convict era of Western Australia

1854 ships
British ships built in India
Age of Sail merchant ships of England
Convict ships to Western Australia
1858 in Australia